The palaces of Tunis are considered as a historical monuments in the medina of Tunis, Tunis.

Politicians, rich people, and notables of the city were those living in these palaces.

Gallery

References